Grimm Tales is a play by British poet Carol Ann Duffy, based on the original fairy tales written down by the Brothers Grimm. The play was first published in 1996. In 1997 she published a sequel, More Grimm Tales. Not all of the stories that were produced by the Brothers Grimm were adapted in the play. The ones that were included Cinderella, Snow White, Hansel and Gretal and The Golden Goose.

References

Fantasy theatre
1996 plays
Plays based on European myths and legends

Works based on Grimms' Fairy Tales